Solanocapsine is a toxic steroidal alkaloid from Solanum pseudocapsicum (Jerusalem cherry).

References 

Steroidal alkaloids
Steroidal alkaloids found in Solanaceae